Senator Emmons may refer to:

Benjamin Emmons (1777–1843), Missouri State Senate
Carlos Emmons (politician) (1799–1875), New York State Senate
Joanne G. Emmons (born 1934), Michigan State Senate
Judy Emmons (fl. 2000s–2010s), Michigan State Senate
Lyman W. Emmons (1885–1955), Illinois State Senate